The Samo (also Sanan) is a sub-ethnic group of the Mandinka people from West Africa. They mainly live in northwest Burkina Faso and across the border in southern Mali.

See also
Samo language (Burkina)

References
 Aboubacar Barry, Alliances peules en pays samo,  L'Harmattan, Paris, 2004, p. 124 (in French)
 Françoise Héritier, L'Exercice de la parenté, Gallimard, Seuil, Paris, 1981, p. 199 (in French) 
 André Nyamba, L'identité et le changement social des Sanan du Burkina Faso, Université Bordeaux 2, 1992, 2 vol., p. 758 (in French)

Mandinka
Ethnic groups in Burkina Faso
Ethnic groups in Mali